Ho Kwan Lung (born 27 November 1976) is a Hong Kong sprinter. He competed in the men's 4 × 100 metres relay at the 2000 Summer Olympics.

References

External links
 

1976 births
Living people
Athletes (track and field) at the 2000 Summer Olympics
Hong Kong male sprinters
Olympic athletes of Hong Kong
Place of birth missing (living people)
Athletes (track and field) at the 1998 Asian Games
Asian Games competitors for Hong Kong